This is a list of elections in the U.S. state of North Carolina.

In a 2020 study, North Carolina was ranked as the 23rd easiest state for citizens to vote in.

Districting

Presidential

United States presidential election in North Carolina, 1824
United States presidential election in North Carolina, 1828
United States presidential election in North Carolina, 1832
United States presidential election in North Carolina, 1836
United States presidential election in North Carolina, 1840
United States presidential election in North Carolina, 1844
United States presidential election in North Carolina, 1964
United States presidential election in North Carolina, 1968
United States presidential election in North Carolina, 1972
United States presidential election in North Carolina, 1976
United States presidential election in North Carolina, 1980
United States presidential election in North Carolina, 1984
United States presidential election in North Carolina, 1988
United States presidential election in North Carolina, 1992
United States presidential election in North Carolina, 1996
United States presidential election in North Carolina, 2000
United States presidential election in North Carolina, 2004
United States presidential election in North Carolina, 2008
United States presidential election in North Carolina, 2012
United States presidential election in North Carolina, 2016
 2020 United States presidential election in North Carolina

National legislative

House of Representatives elections
United States House of Representatives elections in North Carolina, 1996
United States House of Representatives elections in North Carolina, 1998
United States House of Representatives elections in North Carolina, 2000
United States House of Representatives elections in North Carolina, 2002
United States House of Representatives elections in North Carolina, 2004
North Carolina's 1st congressional district special election, 2004
United States House of Representatives elections in North Carolina, 2006
United States House of Representatives elections in North Carolina, 2008
United States House of Representatives elections in North Carolina, 2010
United States House of Representatives elections in North Carolina, 2012
United States House of Representatives elections in North Carolina, 2014
North Carolina's 12th congressional district special election, 2014
United States House of Representatives elections in North Carolina, 2016
United States House of Representatives elections in North Carolina, 2018
2019 North Carolina's 3rd congressional district special election
 2020 United States House of Representatives elections in North Carolina
 2022 United States House of Representatives elections in North Carolina

Senate elections
United States Senate election in North Carolina, 1960
United States Senate election in North Carolina, 1968
United States Senate election in North Carolina, 1972
United States Senate election in North Carolina, 1974
United States Senate election in North Carolina, 1978
United States Senate election in North Carolina, 1980
United States Senate election in North Carolina, 1984
United States Senate election in North Carolina, 1986
United States Senate election in North Carolina, 1990
United States Senate election in North Carolina, 1992
United States Senate election in North Carolina, 1996
United States Senate election in North Carolina, 1998
United States Senate election in North Carolina, 2002
United States Senate election in North Carolina, 2004
United States Senate election in North Carolina, 2008
United States Senate election in North Carolina, 2010
United States Senate election in North Carolina, 2014
United States Senate election in North Carolina, 2016
 2020 United States Senate election in North Carolina
 2022 United States Senate election in North Carolina

State executive

Gubernatorial elections

North Carolina gubernatorial election, 1980
North Carolina gubernatorial election, 1984
North Carolina gubernatorial election, 1988
North Carolina gubernatorial election, 1992
North Carolina gubernatorial election, 1996
North Carolina gubernatorial election, 2000
North Carolina gubernatorial election, 2004
North Carolina gubernatorial election, 2008
North Carolina gubernatorial election, 2012
North Carolina gubernatorial election, 2016
North Carolina gubernatorial election, 2020

Lieutenant Governor elections

North Carolina lieutenant gubernatorial election, 1996
North Carolina lieutenant gubernatorial election, 2000
North Carolina lieutenant gubernatorial election, 2004
North Carolina lieutenant gubernatorial election, 2008
North Carolina lieutenant gubernatorial election, 2012
North Carolina lieutenant gubernatorial election, 2016
North Carolina lieutenant gubernatorial election, 2020

Attorney General elections

North Carolina Attorney General election, 2008
North Carolina Attorney General election, 2012
North Carolina Attorney General election, 2016
North Carolina Attorney General election, 2020

Council of State elections
North Carolina Council of State election, 1996
North Carolina Council of State election, 2000
North Carolina Council of State election, 2004
North Carolina Council of State election, 2008
North Carolina Council of State election, 2012
North Carolina Council of State election, 2016

State legislature

General Assembly elections
North Carolina General Assembly election, 2002
North Carolina General Assembly election, 2004

State Senate elections
2002 North Carolina Senate election
2008 North Carolina Senate election
2014 North Carolina Senate election
2016 North Carolina Senate election
2018 North Carolina Senate election
2020 North Carolina Senate election
2022 North Carolina Senate election

State House elections
2002 North Carolina House of Representatives election
2004 North Carolina House of Representatives election
2006 North Carolina House of Representatives election
2008 North Carolina House of Representatives election
2010 North Carolina House of Representatives election
2012 North Carolina House of Representatives election
2014 North Carolina House of Representatives election
2016 North Carolina House of Representatives election
2018 North Carolina House of Representatives election
2020 North Carolina House of Representatives election
2022 North Carolina House of Representatives election

State judiciary

North Carolina judicial election, 1996
North Carolina judicial election, 1998
North Carolina judicial election, 2000
North Carolina judicial election, 2002
North Carolina judicial election, 2004
North Carolina judicial election, 2006
North Carolina judicial election, 2008
North Carolina judicial election, 2010
North Carolina judicial election, 2012
North Carolina judicial elections, 2014
North Carolina judicial elections, 2016
North Carolina judicial elections, 2018
2020 North Carolina judicial elections

Local

Charlotte mayoral elections

Charlotte mayoral election, 2001
Charlotte mayoral election, 2003
Charlotte mayoral election, 2005
Charlotte mayoral election, 2007
Charlotte mayoral election, 2009
Charlotte mayoral election, 2011
Charlotte mayoral election, 2013
Charlotte mayoral election, 2015
Charlotte mayoral election, 2017
2019 Charlotte mayoral election

Raleigh mayoral elections

Raleigh mayoral election, 2001
Raleigh mayoral election, 2003
Raleigh mayoral election, 2005
Raleigh mayoral election, 2007
Raleigh mayoral election, 2009
Raleigh mayoral election, 2011
Raleigh mayoral election, 2013
Raleigh mayoral election, 2015
Raleigh mayoral election, 2017
2019 Raleigh mayoral election

Other
North Carolina Amendment 1

See also
 2020 North Carolina elections
Electoral reform in North Carolina
North Carolina State Board of Elections and Ethics Enforcement
 Elected officials:
List of United States senators from North Carolina
List of United States representatives from North Carolina
Politics of North Carolina
Political party strength in North Carolina

References

External links

 
 
  (State affiliate of the U.S. League of Women Voters)
 Digital Public Library of America. Assorted materials related to North Carolina elections
 

 
Government of North Carolina
Political events in North Carolina